Tripudia quadrifera is a species of moth in the family Noctuidae (the owlet moths).

References

Further reading

 
 
 

Eustrotiinae
Articles created by Qbugbot
Moths described in 1874